Geophis sartorii, also known commonly as Sartorius' snail-sucker and the terrestrial snail sucker, is a species of snake in the family Colubridae. The species is native to southern North America and Central America. There are two recognized subspecies.

Etymology
The specific name, sartorii, is in honor of German-born Mexican naturalist Christian Carl Wilhelm Sartorius.

Geographic range
G. sartorii is found in southeastern Mexico, and in Belize, Costa Rica, El Salvador, Guatemala, Honduras, and Nicaragua.

Habitat

Description
The body is black, with 16–20 narrow rings, which are yellowish to reddish in color.

Diet
G. sartorii preys upon snails.

Reproduction
G. sartorii is oviparous.

Mimicry
G. sartorii mimicks Micrurus elegans, a species of venomous coral snake with which it is sympatric.

Subspecies
Two subspecies are recognized as being valid, including the nominotypical subspecies.
Geophis sartorius macdougalli 
Geophis sartorii sartorii 

Nota bene: A trinomial authority in parentheses indicates that the subspecies was originally described in a genus other than Geophis.

References

Further reading
Cope ED (1863). "Descriptions of new American SQUAMATA in the Museum of the Smithsonian Institution, Washington". Proceedings of the Academy of Natural Sciences of Philadelphia 15: 100–106. (Tropidodipsas sartorii, new species, p. 100).
De Luna, Manuel; García-Barrios, Roberto (2022). "GEOPHIS SARTORII (Terrestrial Snail Sucker). DIET". Herpetological Review 53 (3): 509–510.
Goldberg SR (2017). "TROPIDODIPSAS SARTORII (Terrestrial Snail Sucker). REPRODUCTION". Herpetological Review 48 (4): 869.
Grünwald CI, Toribio-Jiménez S, Montaño-Ruvalcaba C, Franz-Chávez H, Peñaloza-Montaño MA, Barrera-Nava EY, Jones JM, Rodriguez CM, Hughes IM, Strickland JL, Reyes-Velasco J (2021). "Two new species of snail-eating snakes of the genus Tropidodipsas (Serpentes, Dipsadidae) from Southern Mexico, with notes on related species". Herpetozoa 34: 233–257. (Geophis sartorii, new combination). (in English, with abstracts in Spanish and German).
Heimes P (2016). Snakes of Mexico: Herpetofauna Mexicana Vol. I. Frankfurt, Germany: Chimaira. 572 pp. .
Smith HM (1943). "A new snake of the genus Tropidodipsas from Mexico". Journal of the Washington Academy of Sciences 33: 371–373. (Tropidodipsas macdougalli, new species).

Geophis
Snakes of North America
Reptiles of Mexico
Reptiles of Guatemala
Reptiles of El Salvador
Reptiles of Honduras
Taxa named by Edward Drinker Cope
Reptiles described in 1863